Cambridge School may refer to:

Educational institutions

Canada
 Cambridge Public School (Embrun, Ontario), Ontario, Canada

India
 Cambridge School (Kandivali), Mumbai
 Cambridge Public School, Kikkeri, India
 Cambridge School (Neermarga), Mangalore
 Cambridge School Srinivaspuri, South Delhi
 Colonel Brown Cambridge School, Dehradun

United Kingdom
 Cambridge Judge Business School, Cambridge
 Cambridge Steiner School, Cambridge
 Cambridge School of Art, former name of Anglia Ruskin University

United States
 The Cambridge School of Weston in Massachusetts
 Cambridge School of Architecture and Landscape Architecture
 Cambridge School of Culinary Arts, Cambridge, Massachusetts
 Cambridge Street School in Worcester, Massachusetts
 Cambridge School of Business, former name of Grahm Junior College, Boston, Massachusetts
 Cambridge Rindge and Latin School in Cambridge, Massachusetts
 Cambridge Public School and High School, Wisconsin, United States

Other educational institutions
 The Cambridge School, Doha, Qatar
 Horizon Japan International School, Yokohama, Japan
 St Mary's Cambridge School, Rawalpindi, Pakistan

Intellectual traditions
 Cambridge School (intellectual history), a style of historical methodology
 Cambridge School of historiography

See also 
 Cambridge (disambiguation)
 Cambridge Christian School (disambiguation)
 Cambridge Elementary School (disambiguation)
 Cambridge High School (disambiguation)
 Cambridge International School (disambiguation)
 Cambridge Public School (disambiguation)
 University of Cambridge